Amara Deepam is a 1977 Indian Telugu-language drama film directed by K. Raghavendra Rao. The film stars Krishnam Raju, Murali Mohan and Jayasudha. It is a remake of the Malayalam film Theekkanal (1976) which was earlier remade in Tamil as Dheepam (1977). The film was released on 29 September 1977. Krishnam Raju received the Filmfare Award for Best Actor – Telugu and Nandi Award for Best Actor.

Plot 
Hari and Shiva Prasad are siblings. One day Shiva accidentally breaks their family photo. Hari beats Shiva and runs away from home. Hari is brought up by a notorious smuggler (Kaikala Satyanarayana). The smuggler changes Hari's name into Shri Krishna which was his deceased son's name. Krishna (Krishnam Raju) grows up to be an immoral man who uses women for his own pleasure. He falls in love with Parvati (Jayasudha), who is his adoptive sister Madhavi's (Madhavi) friend. However, Parvati and Shiva Prasad (Murali Mohan) love each other. When Krishna proposes to Parvati, she refuses. A jealous Krishna attempts to kill Shiva Prasad. He accidentally sees their childhood photo and realises that Shiva is his own younger brother. He arranges Shiva Prasad and Parvati's marriage. Shiva Prasad becomes aware of Krishna's love for Parvati. He misunderstands the situation and doubts Parvati's devotion towards him. Krishna learns of this and decides to kill himself for his brother's happiness.

Cast

Soundtrack 
The music was composed by Chellapilla Satyam.

Accolades 
Krishnam Raju won the Filmfare Award for Best Actor – Telugu, and the Nandi Award for Best Actor.

References

External links 

1970s Telugu-language films
1977 films
1977 romantic drama films
Films directed by K. Raghavendra Rao
Films produced by Krishnam Raju
Films scored by Satyam (composer)
Indian romantic drama films
Telugu remakes of Malayalam films